Birch Run Premium Outlets is an outlet mall in Birch Run, Michigan. The largest outlet mall in the Midwestern United States, it opened in 1986. It is managed by Premium Outlets, a division of Simon Property Group. The Birch Run Premium Outlets are located approximately halfway between Saginaw and Flint.

History

The mall was built in 1986 as Manufacturer's Marketplace/Prime Outlets at Birch Run. In 2010, the mall was bought by Simon Property Group's Premium Outlet division and renamed Birch Run Premium Outlets.

The mall's busiest months are August and December, the former due to back-to-school shopping and vacationing travelers. For many years, Birch Run Premium Outlets were the largest outlet mall in the Midwestern United States.

References

External links
Official website

Outlet malls in the United States
Shopping malls established in 1986
Shopping malls in Michigan
Premium Outlets
Tourist attractions in Saginaw County, Michigan